Kim Min-woo (born July 25, 1995) is a South Korean professional baseball pitcher currently playing for the Hanwha Eagles of the KBO League. He competed in the 2020 Summer Olympics.

References

External links
 Career statistics and player information from Korea Baseball Organization

 Kim Min-woo at Hanwha Eagles Baseball Club

Hanwha Eagles players
KBO League pitchers
South Korean baseball players
Olympic baseball players of South Korea
Baseball players at the 2020 Summer Olympics
People from Changwon
1995 births
Living people
Sportspeople from South Gyeongsang Province